Ely Public School District (ISD 696) is a school district in Saint Louis County, Minnesota. 
The district serves supports 4,830 residents over 216 square miles.
The school district is currently under the operation of Superintendent John Klarich, selected by the school board to succeed prior superintendent Erik Erie beginning February 2022.

Schools
As of 2022, the district has about 550 students in two schools, Ely Memorial High School serving grades 6–12, under Principal Jeff Carey, and Washington Elementary serving grades Kindergarten-5, under Principal Anne Oelke.

In Fall of 2022, previously separated buildings were connected as part of a $20 million expansion project. 

Previously, the district had about 550 students across three schools, Memorial High, Memorial Middle, and Washington Elementary. 
The joining of the buildings facilitated the reduction from three administrators to two.

References

External links

 Ely Public School District
 Ely Educational Foundation

School districts in Minnesota
Education in St. Louis County, Minnesota